Rossi Morreale (born April 27, 1977) is a television personality and former college football player.

Career 
Morreale was a starting wide receiver/punt returner for the University of Arkansas Razorbacks football team, lettering from 1997–1999.  After graduation he came out to Hermosa Beach, California on vacation for the summer.

In 2001, he appeared on the second season of Temptation Island as one of the "singles" meant to tempt committed female contestants.   Following that, he was offered a job in Marki Costello's casting office, searching for singles to be contestants on reality shows.  After multiple reality shows, he became the casting assistant to find the next host of Junkyard Wars on TLC.

Between 2002 and 2005 he began presenting on the U.S. version of Junkyard Wars.  In 2003 he was voted in to People Magazine'''s Sexiest Men Alive.  He then went on and hosted G4's series Sweat, G4 Sports and Formula Drift.  After that, he went on to host TBS's Big Playstation Saturday and TBS Weekend Extra.  He then became a correspondent on entertainment programs such as Extra and On Air with Ryan Seacrest.

In 2006, he starred in the music video "Somebody Like You" by the band Pop Evil.  Morreale was the host of the 2007 game show Temptation, an American adaptation of the Australian remake of Sale of the Century.  In 2008, Morreale hosted season one of the Country Music Television reality TV series Can You Duet, a talent search for undiscovered country music duets.  In 2009 and 2010 Morreale went on to host Season 1 & 2 of Dating in the Dark, a reality dating show on ABC.  In 2012, he began hosting NBC's new interactive game-reality show, Escape Routes.  From 2009 to 2012, he has hosted AT&T U-verse Sports and Buzz for AT&T U-verse TV customers.

In 2013, Morreale started hosting American Airgunner, the first and only U.S. televised show to feature airgun shooting sports on the Pursuit Channel.

In 2015, he hosted Season 5 of Halloween Wars'' on Food Network.

Currently he is the managing partner for Event Host Live, an events company, with business partner Brian Corsetti.

Personal life 
Morraele was married to country music singer Kacey Coppola in 2010.  He currently resides in Redondo Beach, California.

Filmography

References

External links 

Arkansas Razorbacks football players
American game show hosts
Living people
Place of birth missing (living people)
1977 births